Dichrorampha plumbana is a moth belonging to the family Tortricidae first described by Giovanni Antonio Scopoli in 1763.
It is native to the Palearctic including Europe.

The wingspan is 11-14 mm.The forewings are dark fuscous, sharply irrorated with pale ochreous, costa obscurely spotted with dark fuscous and whitish ; anterior half obscurely striated or suffused with greyish, forming a slightly paler subtriangular median dorsal blotch ; some streaks from costa posteriorly and margins of ocellus leaden-metallic ; from three to five black dots on termen ; termen rather oblique, sinuation distinct. Hindwings fuscous or dark fuscous.The larva is yellowish- white ; head yellow -brownish ; plate of 2 ochreous.

The larva develops on the roots of yarrow Achillea millefolium and  Leucanthemum vulgare,. The adults fly during the day and into the evening in May-June.

References

Grapholitini